Cloud Nine is the eleventh studio album by English musician George Harrison and the final released in his lifetime. The album was recorded and released in 1987 after Harrison had taken a five-year hiatus from his career as a solo artist. The hit single "Got My Mind Set on You" from this album re-established Harrison as a critically acclaimed and commercially significant recording artist. Cloud Nine was Harrison's last solo studio album released during his lifetime, as his next album Brainwashed was released in 2002, almost a year after his death.

Background and recording
Frustrated with the changing musical climate, Harrison suspended his recording career in the early 1980s. Instead of recording, he opted to pursue other interests, including film production with his own company, Handmade Films. The odd soundtrack or charity song would surface during this period, but otherwise, it was a musically silent period for Harrison.

By late 1986, after a substantial break, Harrison felt the desire to make music again. He asked former Electric Light Orchestra (ELO) leader and fellow musician Jeff Lynne to co-produce a new album with him. After writing a round of new compositions (including the songs already contributed to the 1986 film Shanghai Surprise), Harrison entered his home studio Friar Park in Henley-on-Thames on 5 January 1987 to begin recording his first new commercial album in five years. Having recorded the backing tracks for seventeen songs between January and March, he completed the album's overdubs in August 1987.

Besides Harrison and Lynne, other artists involved in the sessions included Jim Keltner and Ringo Starr on drums, Eric Clapton on guitar and both Gary Wright and Elton John on piano. (The latter was recovering from vocal surgery, at the time.) With new-found enthusiasm, Harrison actively promoted the album, even appearing with Starr at The Prince's Trust Concert that June to perform "While My Guitar Gently Weeps" and "Here Comes the Sun".

Cover art
The cover features Harrison's first American-made guitar, a 1957 Gretsch 6128 that he purchased in Liverpool in 1961. Harrison called it his "old black Gretsch". Harrison gave the guitar to his longtime friend, Klaus Voormann who kept it for 20 years. The guitar had been left in Los Angeles and had been modified. Harrison asked for the return of the guitar, had it restored and used it for the cover shoot.

Release and aftermath
Harrison's cover of Rudy Clark's little-known song "Got My Mind Set on You" quickly reached number 1 in the United States and number 2 in the United Kingdom. It was Harrison's first single to top the US charts since "Give Me Love (Give Me Peace on Earth)" in 1973. A few weeks later, Cloud Nine was released to high anticipation and a favourable critical reception.

The album went to No. 10 in the UK. In the US, it peaked at No. 8 on the Billboard 200 chart and No. 4 on the Cash Box Top 200, and achieved platinum status. It was also number 1 on Cash Boxs Top 40 Compact Discs chart. The success of the single "Got My Mind Set on You" and its accompanying video re-introduced Harrison to the mainstream. The Beatles tribute song "When We Was Fab" was a successful follow-up single, reaching the top 25 in both the UK and US. The next single, "This Is Love", was a minor hit in the UK.

While the success of Cloud Nine was not enough to spur Harrison into a tour, it inspired him to continue making music. In the spring of 1988, along with Lynne, he would call up friends Bob Dylan, Tom Petty and Roy Orbison and begin a project ultimately realised as the Traveling Wilburys.

In 2004, Cloud Nine was remastered and reissued both separately and as part of the deluxe box set The Dark Horse Years 1976–1992 on Dark Horse Records with new distribution by EMI. The reissue included the bonus tracks "Shanghai Surprise" and "Zig Zag" (the latter also released as the B-side to "When We Was Fab") from the film Shanghai Surprise (1986).

Critical reception

Writing in Rolling Stone, David Wild described Cloud Nine as "an expertly crafted, endlessly infectious record that constitutes Harrison's best album since 1970s inspired All Things Must Pass". Wild also acknowledged Lynne's input as co-producer and praised "When We Was Fab", "Cloud 9", "That's What It Takes" and "Wreck of the Hesperus" as "sublime pop". In The New York Times, Stephen Holden noted the release as "crucial" to Harrison's career, adding: "A pleasingly tuneful album, its sound is deliberately quaint, as it explicitly evokes the Beatles' more romantic psychedelic music of the late 1960s." Although he regretted the inclusion of ballads such as "Breath Away from Heaven", Bill Holdship wrote in Creem that "a good album's a good album, and Cloud Nine is plenty good … it's the best record from a former Beatle in at least seven years."

Less impressed, Daniel Brogan of the Chicago Tribune opined: "Cloud Nine plods hopelessly. Most of the blame must fall on Harrison, though producer Jeff Lynne's influence is far too prevalent ... The album is occasionally redeemed by the deft guitar interplay between Harrison and Eric Clapton, as well as the perky single 'Got My Mind Set on You.'" In a five-star review for the Houston Chronicle, J.D. Considine wrote: "Forget the 'former Beatle' stuff – this album would be worth snapping up even if Harrison were some unknown from Encino." After remarking on Harrison's "stellar" cast of backing musicians, Considine added: "But as much as the playing enlivens the material, as with the dark, bluesy guitar riffs that open the title tune, it's the writing that deserves credit for this album's luster."

In a 2001 review, AllMusic editor Stephen Thomas Erlewine also gave the album five stars. He wrote that, with Lynne's help and "the focus on … snappy pop-rock numbers", Harrison "crafted a remarkably consistent and polished comeback effort with Cloud Nine", which Erlewine considered "one of his very best albums". In his 2002 posthumous appraisal of Harrison's solo career, for Goldmine magazine, Dave Thompson described the album as "littered with highlights", of which "This Is Love" was "a jewel" and "When We Was Fab" benefited from Lynne "wringing every last Beatle-esque effect out of his box of sonic tricks".

Among reviews of the 2004 reissue, Uncut described Cloud Nine as "endowed with undeniable charm" and Rolling Stone deemed it to be a "late-career masterwork" from Harrison. Writing for Mojo in 2011, John Harris found the production dated but praised the quality of the songs, including the "splendidly gonzo version" of "Got My Mind Set on You" and the "irresistible" "When We Was Fab", and considered Cloud Nine a "deserved global hit".

Track listing
All songs by George Harrison, except where noted.

Original release
Side one
"Cloud 9" – 3:15
"That's What It Takes" (Harrison, Jeff Lynne, Gary Wright) – 3:59
"Fish on the Sand" – 3:22
"Just for Today" – 4:06
"This Is Love" (Harrison, Lynne) – 3:48
"When We Was Fab" (Harrison, Lynne) – 3:57

Side two
"Devil's Radio" – 3:52
"Someplace Else" – 3:51
"Wreck of the Hesperus" – 3:31
"Breath Away from Heaven" – 3:36
"Got My Mind Set on You" (Rudy Clark) – 3:52

2004 reissue
Bonus tracks
"Shanghai Surprise" – 5:09
"Zig Zag" (Harrison, Lynne) – 2:45

iTunes Store bonus track:
"Got My Mind Set on You (Extended Version)" (Clark) – 5:17

Personnel
The following is taken from the 2004 CD liner notes, except where noted.

George Harrison – lead vocals, electric and acoustic guitars, keyboards, synthesizer, autoharp, sitar, backing vocals
Jeff Lynne – bass, acoustic and electric guitars, keyboards, synthesizer, backing vocals
Eric Clapton – electric guitar on "Cloud 9", "That's What It Takes", "Devil's Radio" and "Wreck of the Hesperus"
Elton John – electric piano on "Cloud 9", piano on "Devil's Radio" and "Wreck of the Hesperus"
Gary Wright – piano on "Just for Today" and "When We Was Fab"
Jim Horn – baritone and tenor saxophones on "Cloud 9", "Wreck of the Hesperus" and "Got My Mind Set on You"
Jim Keltner – drums
Ringo Starr – drums, backing vocals on "When We Was Fab" 
Ray Cooper – drums, percussion
Bobby Kok – cello

Charts

Weekly charts

Year-end charts

Certifications and sales

}

References

External links

1987 albums
George Harrison albums
Albums produced by Jeff Lynne
Albums produced by George Harrison
Dark Horse Records albums
Albums recorded at FPSHOT